Tay Kak Sie Temple is a Taoist temple located at Jalan Gang Lombok, Semarang. The temple was established in 1746. This was originally only to worship the Goddess of Mercy, Guan Yin. This pagoda later developed into a large temple which also worshipped many Taoist Deities.

Tay Kak Sie name written on the signboard at the entrance of a large temple, with the record year of the reign of Emperor Dao Guang (Too Kong in Hokkien language) 1821-1850 of the Qing Dynasty is a name that means "Temple of Supreme Consciousness".

List of Deities 
Tay Kak Sie pagoda has a host of Deities and the main Deity is the goddess Kwan Im Pho Sat. Moreover, Tay Kak Sie temple is the largest temple (in the sense of many Deities) in the city of Semarang. Deities worshiped in this temple include:

 Sam Koan Tay Te (三官大帝)
 Sam Po Hud (三寶佛：Sakia Mo Ni Hud, O Mi To Hud, Yo Su Hud)
 Thian Siang Seng Boo（天上聖母） / Tian Shang Sheng Mu
 Sam Po Tay Jin (Sam Po Kong)
 Cap Pwee Lo Han （十八羅漢）
 Po Seng Tay Te Seng Tay Te（保生大帝）
 Seng Hong Lo Ya Hong Lo Ya（城隍老爺）
 Kong Tik Cun Ong（廣澤尊王）
 Te Cong Po Sat（地藏菩薩）

See also 
 Kim Tek Ie Temple (金德院), Jakarta
 Vihara Bahtera Bhakti (安卒大伯公廟), Jakarta
 Boen Tek Bio (文德廟), Tangerang
 Sam Poo Kong (三保洞), Semarang
 Sanggar Agung (宏善堂), Surabaya
 Hoo Ann Kiong Temple (護安宮), Riau
 Ban Hin Kiong Temple (萬興宮), Manado
 Gunung Timur Temple (東嶽觀), Medan
 Satya Dharma Temple (保安宮), Bali

References

External links 

 Tay Kak Sie – Semarang
 Klenteng Tay Kak Sie Semarang
 Kelenteng Tay Kak Sie Semarang

Buildings and structures in Semarang
18th-century Taoist temples
Taoist temples in Indonesia
Religious buildings and structures completed in 1746
Tourist attractions in Central Java